The 2020 Sam Houston State Bearkats football team represented Sam Houston State University in the 2020–21 NCAA Division I FCS football season as a member of the Southland Conference. The Bearkats were led by seventh-year head coach K. C. Keeler and played their home games at Bowers Stadium.

Background
In August 2020, the Southland Conference canceled all fall sports due to the COVID-19 pandemic in the United States, with the hope that sports would be playable in Spring 2021. That decision canceled all 12 games of the Bearkats' original schedule, putting their season on hold indefinitely. A revised schedule for Spring 2021 was later released.

Preseason

Preseason poll
The Southland Conference released their spring preseason poll in January 2021. The Bearkats were picked to finish second in the conference. In addition, nine Bearkats were chosen to the Preseason All-Southland Team

Preseason All–Southland Teams

Offense

1st Team
Donovan Williams – Running Back, JR
Colby Thomas – Offensive Lineman, SR
Matt McRobert – Punter, RS-SR

2nd Team
Eleasah Anderson – Offensive Lineman, RS-JR

Defense

1st Team
Trace Mascorro – Defensive Lineman, SR
Joseph Wallace – Defensive Lineman, SR

2nd Team
Jevon Leon – Defensive Lineman, SO
Zyon McCollum – Defensive Back, SR
Jaylen Thomas – Defensive Back, SR

Roster

Schedule
Sam Houston State had games scheduled against Mississippi Valley State and Tarleton State, but were canceled due to the COVID-19 pandemic.

In the delayed 2020 season, played in early 2021, the Bearkats went 6–0 in regular season games. The team then won four games in the FCS Playoffs to complete an undefeated 10–0 season, including a 23–21 victory over South Dakota State in the FCS Championship Game, securing the Bearkats their first FCS title.

Game summaries

Southeastern Louisiana

Nicholls

at Lamar

at Northwestern State

McNeese State

at Incarnate Word

Monmouth (first round)

North Dakota State (quarterfinals)

James Madison (semifinals)

South Dakota State (National Championship)

References

Sam Houston State
Sam Houston Bearkats football seasons
NCAA Division I Football Champions
Southland Conference football champion seasons
College football undefeated seasons
Sam Houston State
Sam Houston State Bearkats football